Pungent Stench is a death metal band from Vienna, Austria, formed in 1988. Their last known lineup consists of Martin Schirenc (vocals/guitar), Danny Vacuum (vocals/bass), and Mike G. Mayhem (drums). Pungent Stench achieved early on prominence in the death metal scene due to their unique style of extreme metal and their controversial lyrical content, a seamless blend of gore, paraphilia and black comedy. They dissolved in 1995, re-formed in 1999, then split up again 2007 after recording a final studio album, eventually released in 2018, and re-formed again in 2013.

History
Pungent Stench began in late 1987 when Martin Schirenc and Alex Wank, drummer from Carnage, got together to form a new band. They recruited Jacek Perkowski for the bass player position after months of searching, and by February 1988 the trio started rehearsing together. Barely a month in existence the band had already composed 10 songs, and by April 1988 the band recorded their first demo tape, Mucous Secretion. Recorded live in their rehearsal room, Mucous Secretion featured 5 tracks plus an intro taken out of the first The Evil Dead movie. The tape got very positive reactions from the tapetrading community.

In July 1988, the band travelled to England to record their second demo. Wank was present as a guest during the mixing of Napalm Death's sophomore album, From Enslavement to Obliteration, at the Birdsong Studios in Worcester. After that he booked 2 days for Pungent Stench in the same studio. The band had plans to release this demo in a professional manner, with a printed cover and manufactured tapes, but before the manufacturing process began Pungent Stench got an offer by Nuclear Blast.

Pungent Stench happened to play close by Nuclear Blast's hometown, Donzdorf. The label's staff had already heard about the band and sent someone to watch their show and express the record company's interest in the group. Pungent Stench signed the contract in April 1989 and their first release for Nuclear Blast, a split album with fellow Austrian death metallers Disharmonic Orchestra, came out in June. The record was reasonably successful, moving more than 4,000 units in less than a year. The Extreme Deformity 7-inch vinyl EP, featuring three tracks from their unreleased demo, came out in September to rave reviews.

Pungent Stench's debut For God Your Soul... For Me Your Flesh was released in April 1990. Described as raw and primitive, it shows the band favoring simple song structures and visceral, demented aggression over technical proficiency and over-complicated soloing. The album's title track made it to the "100 Best Death Metal Songs" list compiled by the German version of Metal Hammer.

Around the time their first record came out, Pungent Stench were already an experienced live band, having played with Carcass, Entombed, Napalm Death, Extreme Noise Terror, Atrocity and Prong, among others. By the end of the year they organized their first, six-week European tour (named the "Fleisch Tour"), with Master headlining and Paul Speckmann's thrash metal side project Abomination as the opening act.

Musical style and influences
Pungent Stench were initially inspired by early grindcore (Repulsion, Terrorizer), death metal (Master, Slaughter) and doom metal bands such as Saint Vitus and Witchfinder General. By the time of For God Your Soul... For Me Your Flesh'''s release their listening habits widened considerably. In an interview to Michigan-based fanzine Rot, drummer Alex Wank declared that he was currently into hardcore punk (Sheer Terror, Agnostic Front), industrial music (Swans, Laibach, Coil, Foetus), alternative metal pioneers Faith No More and "rape rock" group The Mentors.

Though Pungent Stench is a death metal band, its musical style has also been influenced by rock and blues. Such non-metal influences can be heard on songs such as "Viva la muerte", "Madcatmachopsychoromantik", "Family Man" and "Got MILF?". Schirenc's choice of guitar (he often plays a Fender Telecaster, a rarity among metal guitarists) probably signals these influences.

Lyrical content
The lyrical content of the songs is more sexually orientated than that of other death metal bands; themes covered include coprophagia, rape, and deviance. The album covers reflect this as well: many of their album covers are transgressive and sometimes shocking photos by Joel-Peter Witkin. This, combining the musical styles of death metal and grindcore, may have influenced the sexually-oriented themes of pornogrind, a subgenre of grindcore.

Members

Final line-up
 Martin Schirenc (also known as El Cochino) – guitars, lead vocals (1988–1995, 1999–2007, 2013–)
 Danny Vacuum – bass, backing vocals (2013–)
 Mike G. Mayhem – drums (2013–)

Former members
 Fabio Testi – bass (2004)
 Jacek Perkowski – bass (1988–1995)
 Reverend Mausna – bass (1999–2004)
 El Gore – bass (2004–2007)
 Alex Wank – drums (1988–1995, 1999–2007)

Timeline

DiscographyMucous Secretion (self-released demo, 1988)
split w/ Disharmonic Orchestra (Nuclear Blast, 1989)Extreme Deformity (7-inch EP under Nuclear Blast, 1989)For God Your Soul... For Me Your Flesh (Nuclear Blast, 1990)Blood, Pus and Gastric Juice (split 7-inch EP with Benediction under Nuclear Blast, 1990)Been Caught Buttering (Nuclear Blast, 1991)屍臭 (limited edition 7-inch EP under Brandnew Sunshine Records, 1991)For God Your Soul... For Me Your Flesh (Nuclear Blast, 1993, 7 remixed songs and 3 re-recorded songs)Dirty Rhymes & Psychotronic Beats (MCD under Nuclear Blast, 1993)Club Mondo Bizarre – For Members Only (Nuclear Blast, 1994)Praise the Names of the Musical Assassins (compilation under Nuclear Blast, 1997)Masters of Moral, Servants of Sin (Nuclear Blast, 2001)Loot, Shoot, Electrocute (split 5" EP with Benediction under Nuclear Blast, 2001)Ampeauty (2004)Smut Kingdom (2018, recorded in 2007)

Video releasesVideo La Muerte (Nuclear Blast, VHS release, 1993) – features three music videos and eight tracks recorded live in Bremen, Germany

References

Bibliography

 Durren, B., & Bush, R. (1990). Pungent Stench. Rot Zine, 2'': 43-45.

External links

Official website
Totem Records

1988 establishments in Austria
Austrian death metal musical groups
Austrian heavy metal musical groups
Austrian musical trios
Musical groups established in 1988
Musical groups disestablished in 2007
Nuclear Blast artists